Penang XI (also known as Penang,  Penang Selection or  Penang FA Selection) is a football team that represents Penang FA in exhibition matches.

History
The Penang XI team is formed by the top players in the Penang FA team. Some of the players are mainly from the Malaysia national team. Penang FA usually plays against Associated Football team throughout the world.

Over a decade`s, Penang FA has always welcoming the visiting teams to against with them. Penang Selection doesn't play a match for a few years. They only play a match if they are invited to. The team mainly play against a pre season friendly match for the opposite team to be prepared for their leagues.

Match 
Below are several top performers matches that be played by Penang.

Chinese Olympic team 1936 tours

Aryan Gymkhana XI (India) tour of Malaya and Singapore 1949

Merdeka friendlies

Japan tour of South East Asia 1958-59

Merdeka friendlies

See also
Penang FC
Penang FC honours

References

Football clubs in Malaysia